The 2017–18 Liga III is the 62nd season of the Liga III, the third tier of the Romanian football league system. The season began on 25 August 2017 and ended on 27 May 2018.

Team changes

To Liga III
Promoted from Liga IV

 ACS Ghiroda
 Agricola Borcea
 Bucovina Rădăuți
 CSM Focșani
 Farul Constanța
 FC Avrig
 Internațional Bălești
 KSE Târgu Secuiesc
 Metalul Buzău
 Oțelul Galați
 Petrolul Ploiești
 Progresul Spartac București
 Sănătatea Darabani
 Șoimii Lipova
 Unirea Tășnad
 Universitatea Cluj
 Victoria Traian
 Viitorul Ghimbav
 Voința Saelele

Relegated from Liga II
 —

From Liga III
Relegated to Liga IV

 Atletico Vaslui
 SC Bacău
 Petrolistul Boldești
 Arsenal Malu
 CS Podari
 UTA II Arad
 ASA II Târgu Mureș
 CS Oşorhei
 Recolta Dorolț
 FC Bistrița

Promoted to Liga II

 Știința Miroslava
 Metaloglobus București
 SCM Pitești
 Ripensia Timișoara
 Hermannstadt

Teams spared from relegation
Metalul Reșița was spared from relegation to Liga III due to withdrawal of Brașov from Liga II.

Sportul Chiscani, Urban Titu, CS Șirineasa and Nuova Mama Mia Becicherecu Mic were spared from relegation to Liga IV due to lack of teams in Liga III.

Excluded teams
After the end of the last season, Râmnicu Vâlcea, Unirea Tărlungeni, Berceni, Șoimii Pâncota were dissolved.

Dinamo II București, Pandurii II Târgu Jiu and Poli II Timișoara withdrew and then were dissolved.

FC Milcov, Șurianu Sebeș, Viitorul Ulmeni, FC Zalău, Unirea Jucu and Viitorul II Constanța withdrew from Liga III.

Other teams
Hermannstadt enrolled in Liga III its second team.

CFR II Cluj, CFR Cluj's second team was also enrolled in Liga III.

CNP Timișoara received the permission to enroll in Liga III, due to the excellent results recorded in the youth championships.

Renamed teams
Voința Saelele was moved from Saelele to Turnu Măgurele and renamed as Voința Turnu Măgurele.

Olimpia Râmnicu Sărat was renamed as CSM Râmnicu Sărat.

League tables

Seria I

Seria II

Seria III

Seria IV

Seria V

Possible relegation
At the end of the championship a special table will be made between 12th places from the 5 series. The last team in this table will relegate also in Liga IV. In this table 12th place teams are included without the points obtained against teams that relegated in their series.

References

2017
3
Romania